Ammonium oxalate, C2H8N2O4 – more commonly written as (NH4)2C2O4 – is an oxalate salt with ammonium (sometimes as a monohydrate). It is a colorless (white) salt under standard conditions and is odorless and non-volatile. It is the ammonium salt of oxalic acid, and occurs in many plants and vegetables.

Vertebrate 
It is produced in the body of vertebrates by metabolism of glyoxylic acid or ascorbic acid. It is not metabolized but excreted in the urine.  It is a constituent of some types of kidney stone. It is also found in guano.

Mineralogy 
Oxammite is a natural, mineral form of ammonium oxalate. This mineral is extremely rare.

Chemistry 
Ammonium oxalate is used as an analytical reagent and general reducing agent. It and other oxalates are used as anticoagulants, to preserve blood outside the body.

Earth sciences 
Acid ammonium oxalate (ammonium oxalate acidified to pH 3 with oxalic acid) is commonly employed in soil chemical analysis to extract iron and aluminium from poorly-crystalline minerals (such as ferrihydrite), iron(II)-bearing minerals (such as magnetite) and organic matter.

References

Ammonium compounds
Anticoagulants
Oxalates